Ammoniphilus is an aerobic and endospore-forming bacterial genus from the family of Paenibacillaceae. Genome size of Aneurinibacillus migulanus strain TP115 is 5,556,554 bp.

References

Paenibacillaceae
Bacteria genera
Bacteria described in 1994